{{DISPLAYTITLE:C16H19N3O4S}}
The molecular formula C16H19N3O4S (molar mass : 349.40 g/mol) may refer to :
 Ampicillin, a beta-lactam antibiotic
 Cefradine, a first generation cephalosporin antibiotic
 Resminostat